Makabana Airport  is an airstrip serving the village of Makabana in the Niari Department, Republic of the Congo.

See also

 List of airports in the Republic of the Congo
 Transport in the Republic of the Congo

References

External links
OurAirports - Makabana
OpenStreetMap - Makabana Airport

Airports in the Republic of the Congo